Anthony "Tony" Mirra (July 18, 1927 – February 18, 1982) was an American mobster, soldier and later caporegime for the Bonanno crime family. He is well known for being the individual who introduced FBI Special Agent Joseph "Donnie Brasco" Pistone into the Bonanno family.

Early life
Mirra was born to Albert Mirra and Millie Embarrato in Manhattan. He was the nephew of Bonanno family caporegime Alfred Embarrato, and cousins of street soldier Joseph D'Amico, capo Richard Cantarella, capo Frank Cantarella, and Bonanno family capo Paul Cantarella.

Mirra was born in the poverty-stricken Lower East Side at Knickerbocker Village where he lived in the same apartment building as Embarrato, Richard Cantarella and D'Amico. The Federal Bureau of Narcotics lists his address of residence at 115 Madison Street (Manhattan) in Lower East Side, New York. Mirra was once a good friend of Benjamin "Lefty" Ruggiero; Mirra owned the Bus Stop Luncheonette in Little Italy, Manhattan not far from Ruggiero's bar. His relatives D'Amico, Embarrato and Cantarella became involved in major racketeering schemes at The New York Post distribution center behind their housing complex, but Mirra moved on to more successful and prosperous racketeering endeavours.

Criminal career
Mirra worked for Bonanno capo Michael Zaffarano, and was involved in extortion, gambling and drug trafficking. During the 1970s, Mirra confessed to the 1959 assassination of Anthony Carfano and comedian Alan Drake's wife, Janice Hansen Drake. The New York Times correspondent Ralph Blumenthal described Mirra's appearance as "Zorba-like". Mirra never drank alcohol, only ginger ale.

Mirra remained a recluse from his fellow mobsters including his own relatives, which included Richard Cantarella, and eventually even became estranged from his uncle Alfred. Mirra was the first contact FBI agent Joseph Pistone made in his undercover operation, which led to his infiltration of the Bonanno family. Pistone was working as an associate for the Colombo family at the time. Mirra introduced Pistone to "Lefty" Ruggiero and offered him a job handling his slot-machine route. Pistone went under the name "Donnie Brasco" and posed as a jewel thief.

In 1977, Mirra fled New York after being indicted for drug trafficking. The FBI caught up with him three months later and he was sent to federal prison again for eight and a half years. When Mirra got out of jail, Brasco had since become close with Ruggiero and was working under him. Mirra argued that Brasco belonged to him, not Ruggiero. Mirra took the issue right to the top and had several meetings over the situation. In the end, Ruggiero won.

After the sudden death of his capo, Michael Zaffarano, Mirra took over the Bonanno family pornography empire and worked under the powerful Sicilian capo Cesare Bonventre. Mirra also muscled in on several Little Italy, Manhattan, restaurants and bars. He was involved in a vending machine operation that dealt in slot machines, peanut vending machines, video arcade machines and pinball machines that were distributed all over New York City. He had them installed in stores, luncheonettes, social clubs and after-hours establishments.

The slot machines, since they were illegal, would be installed in the establishment's back room or basement. The coin collection route produced $2,000 a week, and he would open the machines with a key he carried and give the store owner his cut of the profits (at least $25). Mirra was involved in "strong arm" schemes and extorted from several bars and restaurants. Each of the owners would pay him $5,000 a week in protection money and he would become angry if he did not receive the money.

Bonanno civil war
In 1979, following the takeover of Philip Rastelli as leader of the Bonanno family, the family divided into two rival factions. The "Red" Team led by capos Alphonse "Sonny Red" Indelicato, Dominick Trinchera and Philip Giaccone, and the "Black" Team led by Dominick "Sonny Black" Napolitano and Joseph Massino. The day before Giaccone, Trinchera and Indelicato were to be ambushed and executed, Mirra announced at the Toyland Social Club to Nicholas Marangello that he was joining the opposition.

On May 5, 1981, the day of the executions, Napolitano called Mirra's uncle, Albert Embarrato, and told him to come down to The Motion Lounge for a "sit down". At the sit down, Napolitano had two of his soldiers flank Embarrato on either side until Napolitano received confirmation that the executions were followed through. Napolitano would later tell Pistone, "When he (Albert) heard that, he turned ash white. He thought we were going to hit him too. But I just reamed at him about Tony, told him Tony was no good; and that he (Albert) better recognize that and act right himself." Embarrato agreed.

Reputation
Joseph Pistone said that Mirra was the nastiest and most intimidating man he had met during his seven years undercover. Due to Mirra's irrational behavior, nobody could ever build a close relationship with him. He would never talk about anything that did not involve criminal activities. Pistone said that, "One day you might ask him, 'How's your mother, Tony?' He might say, 'Okay.' Another day you ask him, and he might answer, 'What the fuck you so nosy about?' "
 
He was known among fellow mobsters as a "knife man". It was a common practice for mobsters to carry knives, because they were routinely rousted by police officers and did not want to be caught with firearms. Mirra carried a folding knife with a long blade. Unlike Mirra, it was uncommon for mobsters to ever use their blade, preferring the use of a firearm. Pistone was warned by fellow mobsters that, "If you ever get into an argument with him, make sure you stay an arm's length apart, because he will stick you."
 
Although Mirra was despised, he was tolerated because he was a remarkably good moneymaker. Mirra was a hard worker who was out on the street every day from 8:00a.m. to 3:00p.m., making around $5,000 a day for the family. He once bragged to Pistone that since he had been out of prison, he had made over $200,000. He had a reputation for either cheating people out of money or outright stealing, demanding that goods and services be provided to him "on the arm".
 
He was known to be violent with women, physically abusing his mistresses and threatening to murder one when she confessed that she was a lesbian. Ruggiero told Pistone that the problem with Mirra was that he was always abusing somebody. Mirra insulted everybody and was always in arguments. Mirra was so loathed by mobsters that when Donnie Brasco was revealed to be an undercover agent, he immediately went into hiding instead of attempting to negotiate for his own life, as he knew that countless mafiosi would be eager to take the opportunity to murder him.

Operation Donnie Brasco and death
In mid-1981, when Pistone was revealed as an FBI agent, "Sonny Black" Napolitano, "Lefty" Ruggiero, and Mirra were all in the firing line for initially allowing the infiltration. Mirra went into hiding. Joseph Massino ordered Mirra's uncle Alfred Embarrato and Mirra's two cousins, Richard Cantarella and Joseph D'Amico, to find and kill him. On February 18, 1982, D'Amico lured him to a parking garage in Lower Manhattan. Embarrato and Cantarella were waiting in a getaway car. The pair went to the parking garage, climbed into Mirra's car, and drove up to a locked security gate. D'Amico later described in a testimony, "He took out his key, put it in the box, but he didn't get a chance to turn the box... I shot him at close range several times on the side of his head."

References

External links
FBI Files pertaining to Anthony Mirra
 Carpenter, Teresa, Mob Girl: The biography of Arlyne Weiss
Crittle, Simon, The Last Godfather: The Rise and Fall of Joey Massino Berkley (March 7, 2006) 
Dearborn, Mary V., Mailer: A Biography Mariner Books (December 10, 2001) 
May, Allan, Colletti & Drake: Women In the Wrong Place At the Wrong Time
Pistone, Joseph D. and Woodley, Richard, Donnie Brasco: My Undercover Life in the Mafia Random House 1990 
Pistone, Joseph D.; & Brandt, Charles (2007). Donnie Brasco: Unfinished Business, Running Press. .
DeStefano, Anthony. The Last Godfather: Joey Massino & the Fall of the Bonanno Crime Family. California: Citadel, 2006.
Raab, Selwyn. Five Families: The Rise, Decline, and Resurgence of America's Most Powerful Mafia Empires. New York: St. Martin Press, 2005. 
Anthony Mirra FamilySearch Profile

 

1927 births
1982 deaths
Bonanno crime family
Murdered American gangsters of Italian descent
People from the Lower East Side
People murdered in New York City
Male murder victims
People murdered by the Bonanno crime family
Deaths by firearm in Manhattan